Talawa is a rural locality in the local government area of Dorset in the North-east region of Tasmania. The 2016 census determined a population of 53 for the state suburb of Talawa.

History
Talawa is a confirmed suburb/locality. The name is an Aboriginal word meaning rain.

Geography
The Ringarooma River passes through from south to north.

Road infrastructure
The C423 route (Mathinna Plains Road) follows the eastern boundary for a short distance. Route C426 (Barnett Street / East Maurice Road / Cottons Bridge Road) starts at an intersection with C423 and runs west across the locality before exiting to the north-west. Route C427 (a continuation of East Maurice Road) starts at an intersection with C426 and runs north before exiting.

References

Localities of Dorset Council (Australia)
Towns in Tasmania